Piercefield is a placename and may refer to:

 Piercefield, County Westmeath, a townland in Portnashangan civil parish, barony of Corkaree, County Westmeath, Ireland
 Piercefield House,  a largely ruined neo-classical country house located near Chepstow in Monmouthshire, south–east Wales
Piercefield, New York, a town in St. Lawrence County, New York, United States.
 Piercefield or Templeoran, also known as Templeoran,  a townland in Templeoran civil parish, barony of Moygoish, County Westmeath, Ireland